|}

The Wentworth Stakes is a Listed flat horse race in Great Britain open to horses aged three years or older. It is run at Doncaster over a distance of 6 furlongs and 2 yards (1,209 metres), and it is scheduled to take place each year in November.

Before 1995 the race was known as the Remembrance Day Stakes.

Winners since 1988

See also
 Horse racing in Great Britain
 List of British flat horse races

References 

 Paris-Turf: 
Racing Post: 

Flat races in Great Britain
Doncaster Racecourse
Open sprint category horse races